Yun Yong-il (born 31 July 1988) is a North Korean footballer. He represented North Korea on at least sixteen occasions between 2007 and 2010.

Career statistics

International

References

External links

1988 births
Living people
Sportspeople from Pyongyang
North Korean footballers
North Korea youth international footballers
North Korea international footballers
Association football midfielders
Wolmido Sports Club players